The Quiller Memorandum is a 1966 British neo noir eurospy film filmed in Deluxe Color and Panavision, adapted from the 1965 spy novel The Berlin Memorandum, by Elleston Trevor under the name "Adam Hall", screenplay by Harold Pinter, directed by Michael Anderson, featuring George Segal, Alec Guinness, Max von Sydow and Senta Berger. The film was shot on location in West Berlin and in Pinewood Studios, England. It was nominated for three BAFTA Awards, while Pinter was nominated for an Edgar Award for the script.

The film is a spy-thriller set in 1960s West Berlin, where agent Quiller is sent to investigate a neo-Nazi organisation.

The film had its world premiere on 10 November 1966 at the Odeon Leicester Square in the West End of London.

Plot

A man walks along a deserted Berlin street at night and enters an internally lit phone box. He is shot dead by an unseen gunman. He is British secret agent Kenneth Lindsay Jones.

At lunch in an exclusive club in London, close to Buckingham Palace, the directors of an unnamed agency, Gibbs and Rushington, decide to send American agent Quiller to continue the assignment, which has now killed two agents. Quiller meets his controller for this mission, Pol, at Berlin's Olympia Stadium, and learns that he must find the headquarters of Phoenix, a neo-Nazi organization.

Quiller leaves the Konigshof Hotel on West Berlin's Kurfurstendamm and confronts a man who has been following him, learning that it is his minder, Hengel. Hengel gives Quiller the few items found on Jones: a bowling alley ticket, a swimming pool ticket and a newspaper article about a Nazi war criminal found teaching at a school. Quiller asks after Jones at the bowling alley without success and the swimming pool manager Hassler tells him spectating is not allowed.

Pretending to be a reporter, Quiller visits the school featured in the article. The headmistress introduces him to a teacher who speaks English, Inge Lindt. After the interview, he gives her a ride to her flat and stops in for a drink.

Quiller confronts a man who seems to be following him, revealing that he (Quiller) speaks German fluently. When Quiller returns to his hotel, a porter bumps Quiller's leg with a suitcase on the steps. Quiller drives off, managing to shake Hengel, then notices men in another car following him. Quiller becomes drowsy from a drug that was injected by the porter at the entrance to the hotel. When Quiller passes out at a traffic stop, the other car pulls alongside and abducts him.

Quiller awakes in a dilapidated mansion, surrounded by many of the previous incidental characters. They are all members of Phoenix, led by the German aristocrat code-named Oktober. Quiller avoids answering Oktober's questions about Quiller's agency, until a doctor injects him with a truth serum, after which he reveals a few minor clues. In a feint to see if Quiller will reveal more by oversight, Oktober decides to spare his life.

Quiller wakes up beside Berlin's Spree River. He steals a taxi, evades a pursuing vehicle and books himself into a squalid hotel. He calls Inge and arranges to meet. He first meets with Pol, who explains that each side is trying to discover and annihilate the other's base.

Quiller admits to Inge that he is an "investigator" on the trail of neo-Nazis. After they have sex, she unexpectedly reveals that a friend was formerly involved with neo-Nazis and might know the location of Phoenix's HQ. The friend proves to be Hassler, who is now much more friendly. Hassler drives them to meet an old contact he says knows a lot more, who turns out to be Inge's headmistress. She claims she turned in the teacher from the article, and points out the dilapidated Phoenix mansion.

When Quiller decides to investigate the building, Inge says she will wait for him, while Hassler and the headmistress leave one of their cars for them. Inge tells him she loves him, and he tells her a phone number to call if he is not back in 20 minutes.

Quiller enters the mansion and is confronted by Phoenix thugs. Oktober reveals they are moving base the next day and that they have captured Inge. Oktober demands Quiller reveal the Secret Intelligence Service (SIS) base by dawn or Inge will be killed. Quiller is released. He walks down the same street where Jones was shot, but finds he is followed by Oktober's men. After being prevented from using a phone, Quiller makes a run for an elevated train, and thinking he has managed to shake off Oktober's men, exits the other side of the elevated station only to run into them again.

Quiller then returns to his hotel, followed by the men who remain outside. He notices the concierge is seated where he can see anyone leaving. Quiller slips out though a side door to the small garage yard where his car is kept. He finds that a bomb has been strapped underneath and sets it on the bonnet of the car so it will slowly slide and fall off due to vibration from the running engine. He manages to get over the wall of his garage stall as well as the adjoining one and then outside to the side of the building before detonation. He is shielded behind the building when the bomb explodes. The thugs believe him dead when they see the burning wreckage.

Quiller reaches Pol's secret office in Berlin, one of the top floors in the newly built Europa-Center, the tallest building in the city, and gives them the location of the building where he met Oktober. Pol dispatches a team to Phoenix's HQ, which successfully captures all of Phoenix's members. Quiller is surprised to learn that no women were found.

Quiller goes back to the school and confronts Inge in her classroom. She states that she "was lucky, they let me go" and claims she then called the phone number but it did not work. Quiller tells Inge that they got most, but clearly not all, of the neo-Nazis. Quiller continues his subtle accusations, and Inge continues her denial of ever meeting Jones. Quiller leaves, startling the headmistress on the way out.

Cast
 George Segal as Quiller
 Alec Guinness as Pol
 Max von Sydow as Oktober
 Senta Berger as Inge Lindt
 George Sanders as Gibbs
 Robert Helpmann as Weng
 Robert Flemyng as Rushington
 Peter Carsten as Hengel
 Edith Schneider as Headmistress
 Günter Meisner as Hassler
 Philip Madoc as Oktober's Man (Man with brown trousers)

Awards and critical reception
At the 1967 BAFTA Awards the film had nominations in the best Art Direction, Film Editing and Screenplay categories, but did not win. Harold Pinter was nominated for an Edgar Award in the Best Motion Picture category, but also didn't win.

In a contemporary review for The New York Times, critic Bosley Crowther wrote: "Clearly, 'The Quiller Memorandum' is claptrap done up in a style and with a musical score by John Barry that might lead you to think it is Art. But don't let it fool you for one minute–nor Mr. Segal, nor Senta Berger as the girl. The whole thing, including these two actors, is as hollow as a shell."

The review aggregator website Rotten Tomatoes reports that 67% of critics have given the film a positive rating, based on 12 reviews, with an average score of 7.4/10. Variety wrote that "it relies on a straight narrative storyline, simple but holding, literate dialog and well-drawn characters". Ian Nathan of Empire described the film as "daft, dated and outright confusing most of the time, but undeniably fun" and rated it with 3/5 stars.

Box office
According to Fox records, the film needed to earn $2,600,000 in rentals to break even and made $2,575,000, meaning it initially showed a marginal loss, but subsequent television and home video sales moved it into the black.

Score and soundtrack

The mainly orchestral atmospheric soundtrack composed by John Barry was released by Columbia in 1966. Performed by Matt Monro, "Wednesday's Child" was also released as a single.

 "Wednesday's Child" – main theme (instrumental)
 "Quiller Caught" – The Fight
 "The Barrel Organ"
 "Oktober" – Walk from the River
 "Downtown" (composed by Tony Hatch) 		
 "Main Title Theme"
 "Wednesday's Child" – vocal version (lyrics: Mack David / vocals: Matt Monro)		 
 "The Love Scene" – The Old House
 "Autobahn March"
 "He Knows The Way Out"
 "Night Walk in Berlin"
 "Quiller and the Bomb"
 "Have You Heard of a Man Called Jones?" – closing theme

References

External links
 
 
 
 
 

1966 films
1960s spy drama films
British spy drama films
Cold War spy films
Films directed by Michael Anderson
Films with screenplays by Harold Pinter
Films based on British novels
Films set in West Germany
Films set in Berlin
Films about the Berlin Wall
Films scored by John Barry (composer)
1966 drama films
1960s English-language films
1960s British films